Qeshlaq-e Kazem Owghlan (also Romanized as Qeshlāq-e Kāẓem Owghlān) is a village in Qeshlaq-e Gharbi Rural District, Aslan Duz District, Parsabad County, Ardabil Province, Iran. At the 2006 census, its population was 73, in 15 families.

References 

Towns and villages in Parsabad County